Lacerta oertzeni, the rock lizard, is a species of lizard in the family Lacertidae. It is found in Greece and Turkey.
Its natural habitats are Mediterranean-type shrubby vegetation, rocky areas, rocky shores, pastureland, plantations, and rural gardens.  It is also called Anatololacerta oertzeni.

References

Lacerta (genus)
Reptiles described in 1904
Taxonomy articles created by Polbot
Taxobox binomials not recognized by IUCN